is a Japanese professional basketball player for SeaHorses Mikawa of the B.League. He played college basketball for the Georgia Tech Yellow Jackets. Schafer has been a member of the Japan national basketball team.

Early life 
Schafer was born in Suita, Osaka Prefecture, to a Japanese mother, Sayuki, and an American father, Douglas. He initially played soccer before switching to basketball in tenth grade, at the age of 16.

High school career 
Schafer attended Kobe University Secondary School in Higashinada and St. Mary's International School in Tokyo. He played club basketball with Tokyo Samurai, a recognized American Amateur Athletic Union based in Japan. Schafer, who initially played the sport for fun, cited that playing with the club opened the door to many basketball opportunities such as joining the national team, playing in NCAA Division I and pursuing a professional career. 

After moving to the United States, Schafer attended prep school Brewster Academy in Wolfeboro, New Hampshire and played varsity basketball for the Bobcats during his senior year. He helped the team finish the season with a 33–0 record and win the national prep school championship and the NEPSAC class AAA title.

College career 
Schafer attended Georgia Tech and played for the Yellow Jackets. He made his collegiate debut on 22 November 2017, against the UTRGV Vaqueros. As a freshman, Schafer totaled two rebounds and three minutes over four games. As a sophomore, he appeared in two games, garnering a total of two rebounds and three minutes, before leaving Georgia Tech in the fall of 2018 to play professional basketball in Japan.

Professional career

Alvark Tokyo (2018–2019) 
On 19 December 2018, Schafer signed with Alvark Tokyo of the B.League, joining the team in the middle of the season. He made his professional debut on 22 December, against the Yokohama B-Corsairs, scoring two points and grabbing one rebound across three minutes of action. Tokyo went on to win the 2019 B.League championship title after defeating the Chiba Jets Funabashi. For the season, Schafer averaged 1.2 points, 0.7 rebounds and 0.1 assists in 3.6 minutes over 14 games.

On 24 May 2019, Tokyo extended Schafer’s contract for another season.

Shiga Lakestars (2019–2020) 
On 29 July 2019, Shiga Lakestars announced they have acquired Schafer from Alvark Tokyo via loan transfer. On 2 December, Schafer earned his first B.League All-Star selection. He was also named as one of the participants in the dunk contest. On 14 March 2020, he logged his first career double-double with 16 points and 14 rebounds, both season-highs, in a loss against his former team. Schafer appeared in 41 games, including 9 starts, averaging 4.1 points, 4.5 rebounds and 0.8 assists in 15.2 minutes per game while shooting 49.7 percent from the field. Following his performance, he was named to the B.League Best Five Rookies.

SeaHorses Mikawa (2020–present) 
On 27 May 2020, Schafer signed a one-year deal with SeaHorses Mikawa. On 14 December, he was named to the B.League All-Star list, making it his second consecutive appearance. On 24 April 2021, Schafer logged a season-high 24 points in a 106–102 overtime loss to Shimane Susanoo Magic. On 9 May, he logged a double-double with 19 points and a season-high 19 rebounds in a win over Osaka Evessa. Schafer started and played in all 55 games, averaging 9.5 points, 4.7 rebounds and 1.3 assists per game while shooting 51.1 percent from the field and 35.9 percent from three.

On 14 June 2021, Mikawa extended Schafer’s contract for another season.

National team career

Junior national team 
Schafer made his international debut when he was selected to be a part of the Japanese squad that competed at the 2016 FIBA Asia Under-18 Championship, where he helped the team win the silver medal. In a game against Indonesia, Schafer logged a double-double with 12 points and 11 rebounds. He averaged 4.9 points, 4.5 rebounds and 0.8 assists per game. 

The following year, Schafer suited up for Japan at the 2017 FIBA Under-19 Basketball World Cup, where he averaged 5.0 points, 4.9 rebounds and 0.1 assists per game and was the team's second-leading rebounder. Schafer posted a double-double twice, 11 points and 10 rebounds against Mali and 10 points and 10 rebounds versus Korea.

Senior national team 
Schafer debuted for the senior national team at the 2018 William Jones Cup.

A year later, Schafer competed for the Japanese squad at the 2019 William Jones Cup, where he helped the team win the bronze medal. He had 14 points and 8 rebounds in a game against Korea. Schafer averaged 7.1 points, 4.0 rebounds and 0.6 assists per game. The following month, he represented Japan at the 2019 FIBA Basketball World Cup, where he only played in two games.

Schafer played for Japan at the 2021 FIBA Asia Cup Qualifiers, where he averaged 6.5 points, 3.5 rebounds and 0.8 assists per game. His tournament highlights included a double-double outing with 11 points and 10 rebounds against Chinese Taipei.

Personal life 
Schafer has two brothers. His older brother, Yuki, played soccer at Chapman University. 

Schafer's father is Jewish.

Career statistics

College 

|-
| style="text-align:left;"| 2017–18
| style="text-align:left;"| Georgia Tech
| 4 || 0 || .8 || .000 || – || – || .5 || .0 || .0 || .0 || .0
|-
| style="text-align:left;"| 2018–19
| style="text-align:left;"| Georgia Tech
| 2 || 0 || 1.5 || – || – || – || 1.0 || .0 || .0 || .0 || .0
|- class="sortbottom"
| style="text-align:center;" colspan="2"| Career
| 6 || 0 || 1.0 || .000 || – || – || .7 || .0 || .0 || .0 || .0

See also
List of select Jewish basketball players

References

External links 

 Career stastistics from basketballnavi.com
 Georgia Tech Yellow Jackets bio
 College career statistics from Sports-Reference.com
 Avi Koki Schafer at the 2021 FIBA Asia Cup Qualifiers at fiba.basketball
 Avi Koki Schafer at the 2019 FIBA Basketball World Cup at fiba.basketball
 Avi Koki Schafer at the 2017 FIBA Under-19 Basketball World Cup at fiba.basketball
 Avi Koki Schafer at the 2016 FIBA Asia Under-18 Championship at fiba.basketball
 Avi Koki Schafer at archive.fiba.com
 

1998 births
Living people
Sportspeople from Osaka Prefecture
Japanese men's basketball players
Centers (basketball)
Japanese expatriate basketball people in the United States
Brewster Academy alumni
Georgia Tech Yellow Jackets men's basketball players
Shiga Lakes players
Asian Games competitors for Japan
Basketball players at the 2018 Asian Games
2019 FIBA Basketball World Cup players
Jewish men's basketball players
Japanese people of American-Jewish descent
Japanese Jews
People from Suita
Basketball players at the 2020 Summer Olympics
Olympic basketball players of Japan